George Triantis is an American lawyer, focusing in bankruptcy, business and corporate law, commercial, contract and risk management, currently the Charles J. Meyers Professor at Stanford Law School and formerly the James and Patricia Kowal Professor of Law there and then also Eli Goldston Professor at Harvard Law School, and is also an Elected Fellow of the American Academy of Arts & Sciences.

References

Year of birth missing (living people)
Living people
Stanford University faculty
American lawyers
Harvard Law School faculty